Ar-Rahman (The Merciful) is the 55th Chapter (Surah) of the Qur'an, with 78 verses (āyāt).

The title of the surah, Ar-Rahman, appears in verse 1 and means "The Most Beneficent". The divine appellation "ar-Rahman" also appears in the opening formula which precedes every surah except Sura 9 ("In the Name of God, the Lord of Mercy, the Giver of Mercy"). English translations of the surah's title include "The Most Gracious", "The All Merciful", "The Lord of Mercy", "The Beneficent", and "The Mercy-Giving". In the fourth century CE south Arabian pagan inscriptions started to be replaced by monotheistic expressions, using the term rahmān.

There is disagreement over whether Ar-Rahman ought to be categorized as a surah of the Meccan or Medinan period. Theodor Nöldeke and Carl Ernst have categorized it among the surahs of the early Meccan period (in accordance with its short ayah length), but Abdel Haleem has categorized it in his translation as Medinan, although most Muslim scholars place Sūrat ar-Rahman in the Meccan period.  According to the traditional Egyptian chronology, Ar-Rahman was the 97th surah revealed. Nöldeke places it earlier, at 43, while Ernst suggests that it was the fifth surah revealed.

Summary
1-4 God taught the Quran to the human
5-16 God the creator of all things 
17-25 God controlled the seas and all that is therein
26-30 God ever liveth, though all else decay and die
31-40 God will certainly judge both men and jinn
41-45 God will consign the wicked to hell-fire
46-78 The joys of Paradise described

Structure 
Ar-Rahman is composed entirely in saj’, the rhymed, accent-based prose characteristic of early Arabic poetry.

The most notable structural feature of Ar-Rahman is the refrain "Which, then, of your Lord’s blessings do you both deny?" (or, in Arberry’s rendering, "O which of your Lord's bounties will you and you deny?"), which is repeated 31 times in the 78 verses.

Chapter 55 (Surah Rahman) is composed of 26 couplets, 4 tercets, and an introductory stanza of 13 verses all ending with this refrain.  The final couplet is followed by a blessing of God's name.

Thematically, Ar-Rahman can be divided into roughly three units.
Verses 1-30 expound upon natural displays of Allah's creative power and mercy in showering those who inhabit the earth with blessings.
Verses 31-45 describe the final judgment and the terrible punishment that will be inflicted upon sinners.  
Verses 46–78, by contrast, detail the delights that await the pious in paradise.

Ayat (Verses)

Q55:70-77 Houri

Muhammad Asad asserts that the "noun hur - rendered as 'companions pure' - is a plural of both ahwar (masculine) and hawra' (female), either of which describes a person distinguished by hawar', which latter term primarily denotes 'intense whiteness of the eyeballs and lustrous black of the iris'. Asad as well as Yusuf Ali and Marmaduke Pickthall translate this verse as:

 
According to Ibn Kathir, the believer will be given a tent 60 miles wide, made of pearl, such that his wives will not see each other.  The believer will visit them all. The Enlightening Commentary into the Light of the Holy Qur'an says that they (the Houri) are good and righteous virgins and are intended to have intercourse only with their husbands.

Hadith
Owing to the sura’s poetic beauty, it is often regarded as the 'beauty of the Quran', in accordance with a hadith: Abdullah ibn Mas'ud reported that Muhammad said, "Everything has an adornment, and the adornment of the Qur'an is Surah Ar-Rahman"

References

External links 

Quran 55
Ar-Rahman Benefits

Rahman

Islamic theology